This article lists active sailing yachts in excess of  in sparred length. This list features vessels with sails which were classed as yachts when they were launched as well as any vessels which were subsequently converted to operate with sails and re-classed as yachts.

Comparison of largest yachts

Full list

See also
Comparison of large sloops
List of large sailing vessels
List of motor yachts by length
List of sailboat designers and manufacturers
List of schooners

References

Lists of individual sailing yachts
Sailing yacht